is a railway station in the town of Shiwa, Iwate Prefecture, Japan, operated by East Japan Railway Company (JR East).

Lines
Hizume Station is served by the Tōhoku Main Line, and is located 516.9 rail kilometers from the terminus of the line at Tokyo Station.

Station layout
The station has an island platform and a single side platform serving three tracks, connected to the station building by a footbridge.  The station is staffed and has a Midori no Madoguchi ticket office.

Platforms

History
Hizume Station was opened on 1 November 1890. The station was absorbed into the JR East network upon the privatization of the Japanese National Railways (JNR) on 1 April 1987.

Passenger statistics
In fiscal 2018, the station was used by an average of 515 passengers daily (boarding passengers only).

Surrounding area
 Kodō Nomura Memorial Museum

See also
 List of Railway Stations in Japan

References

External links

  

Railway stations in Iwate Prefecture
Tōhoku Main Line
Railway stations in Japan opened in 1890
Shiwa, Iwate
Stations of East Japan Railway Company